Robert Kirby (16 April 1948 – 3 October 2009) was a British-born arranger of string sections for rock and folk music. He was best known for his work on the Nick Drake albums, Five Leaves Left and Bryter Layter, but also worked with Vashti Bunyan, Elton John, Ralph McTell, Strawbs, Paul Weller and Elvis Costello.

Early life
He was educated at Bishop's Stortford College an independent school in Hertfordshire, and then Gonville and Caius College, Cambridge.

Cambridge University 
Patrick Humphries' book Way To Blue gives some details of Kirby's time at university.

He sang in a group called 'The Gentle Power of Song'. His tutor once told him that his compositions sounded like a breakfast cereal commercial. This was intended as an insult, but Kirby took this as his high praise: "As good as that, eh?". Kirby went to Caius College, Cambridge and made friends with Paul Wheeler. They were both members of the Caius Breakfast Club, also called "The Loungers". There were few rules. You had to have a Loungers' breakfast on Sundays, and 'stand by ye gate once a day and observe what strange creatures God hath made'.  There was a rule that permitted an outsider (the 'Oddefellowe') to become a member. Robert and Paul were both friends with Nick Drake so they invited him to be the Oddefellowe. There is a line in Drake's song "Way To Blue" which seems to echo one of the rules of the Loungers:

"We will wait at your gate, hoping like the blind..."

The May Ball
Kirby recruited eight musicians (seven women and one man) to play alongside Nick Drake at the Caius May Ball. Kirby wore evening dress, and the seven women wore black ankle-length dresses with white feather boas. They performed in the library. Four of the songs were with the string orchestra and a couple of others were Drake solo. After every third song, they played classical music (Leopold Mozart and Tomaso Albinoni).

Five Leaves Left
When Joe Boyd recruited Drake to record an album, he already had a string arranger in mind, Richard A. Hewson. Drake rejected the few Hewson arrangements produced and announced that he already had a friend at university who could do a better job—Kirby.  Drake had decided to leave university without completing his final year. When Kirby was offered the contract to arrange music for an entire album, he, too, gave up Cambridge university.  Though Kirby arranged and conducted strings for the majority of Five Leaves, Harry Robinson was commissioned to arrange the strings for the centerpiece song, "River Man".

- John Wood, sound engineer for Five Leaves Left

Life as an arranger 
Although Kirby had recorded arrangements for over 40 albums by 1978, it was a struggle to make ends meet. In the end he decided to work in marketing industry instead. He was rumoured still to have his scores for Drake's records in his mother's potting shed. (He also was for three years, 1975–1978 one of the two keyboard players for Strawbs, touring the UK and internationally, and getting some composing credits on the albums Deep Cuts, Deadlines and Burning for You). He also did some further arranging for Strawbs with Baroque & Roll (2001), Déjà Fou (2004) and Dancing to the Devil's Beat (2009). He talks extensively about his career in Nick Awde's study Mellotron, subtitled The Machine and the Musicians That Revolutionized Rock (2008) – the book opens with a quote from him.  

One of Roberts lasting associations was with Shelagh McDonald. It was Sandy Roberton, Shelagh's then producer who invited her to visit Robert's flat, and to introduce her to what was to be one of the legendary associations of all time.  Robert's instant liking for Shelagh resulted in his orchestral arrangements for songs on both Shelagh McDonald's albums  'Stargazer' and 'Album'....The legacy of these recordings  could possibly  be regarded today as the genesis of 'Folk Rock'

Public performances of Nick Drake's music
On 2 July 2005, Kirby conducted an 18-piece orchestra in Manhattan's Central Park for a show of Drake's music, using his original scores.  Five Leaves Left was performed in its entirety as well as excerpts from Bryter Later and Made To Love Magic.  The show starred guitarist Josh Max and singer Julie James of the Manhattan-based group The Maxes, and was attended by 3,000 Drake fans from all over the US.

Death
Robert Kirby died in a West London hospital following emergency heart surgery after a short illness on 3 October 2009. He was 61 years old.

Discography 

Nick Drake: Five Leaves Left (1969)
Nick Drake: Bryter Layter (1970)
Vashti Bunyan: Just Another Diamond Day (1970)
Bernie Taupin: Bernie Taupin (1970)
Shelagh McDonald: Stargazer (1971)
Audience: The House on the Hill (1971)
Gillian McPherson: Poets and Painters and Performers of Blues (1971)
Ralph McTell: You Well-Meaning Brought Me Here (1971)
Keith Christmas: Pigmy (1971)
Tim Hart and Maddy Prior: Summer Solstice (1971)
Cochise: So Far (1971)
Steve Gibbons: Short Stories (1971)
Andy Roberts: Nina and the Dream Tree (1971)
John Kongos: John Kongos (1971)
Spirogyra: St. Radigunds (1971)
Elton John: Madman Across The Water (1971)
Claggers: Chumley's Laughing Gear (1971)
Strawbs: Grave New World (1972)
David Ackles: American Gothic (1972)
Mick Audsley: Dark and Devil Waters (1972)
B.J. Cole: The New Hovering Dog (1972)
David Elliott: David Elliott (1972)
Dave Cousins: Two Weeks Last Summer (1972)
Strawbs: Bursting at the Seams (1972)
Mike Silver: Troubadour (1973)
Lynsey De Paul: Surprise (1973)
Steve Ashley: Stroll On (1974)
Steve Ashley: Speedy Return (1975)
John Cale: Helen of Troy (1975)
Gary Shearston: The Greatest Show on Earth (1975)
Richard Digance: Trading the Boards (1975)
Chris DeBurgh: Spanish Train and Other Stories (1975)
Strawbs: Deep Cuts (1976)
Design: By Design (1976) (three tracks)
Spriguns: Time Will Pass (1977)
Sandy Denny: Rendezvous (1977)
Strawbs: Burning for You (1977)
Strawbs: Deadlines (1978)
Arthur Brown: Chisholm in my Bosom (1978)
Richard and Linda Thompson: First Light (1978)
Roger McGough: Summer with Monika (1978)
Iain Matthews: Stealin' Home (1978)
Jim Rafferty: Solid Logic (1979)
Ralph McTell: Slide Away the Screen (1979)
Aj Webber: Of This Land (1980)
Elvis Costello: Almost Blue (1982)
Nick Lowe: Nick Lowe and his Cowboy Outfit (1984)
Any Trouble: Wrong Eng of the Race (1984)
The London Symphony Orchestra: Screen Classics, Vol. 7 (1994)
Catchers: Stooping to Fit (1998)
Ben & Jason: Hello (1999)
Steve Ashley: The Test of Time (1999)
Paul Weller: Heliocentric (2000)
Acoustic Strawbs: Baroque & Roll (2001)
Flemming: Starry Night (2001)
Flemming: Old Boys, Chances for tomorrow (2002)
Nick Drake: Made to Love Magic (2004)
Henrik Levy: ’’A Letter from a City Man’’ (2004)
Strawbs: Déjà Fou (2004)
Vashti Bunyan: Lookaftering (2005)
Steve Ashley: Live in Concert (2006)
The Magic Numbers: Those The Brokes (2006)
a balladeer: Panama (2006)
Teddy Thompson: Upfront & Down Low (2007)
Linda Thompson: Versatile Heart (2007)
Steve Ashley: Time and Tide (2007)
Luke Jackson: ...And Then Some (2008)
Strawbs: Dancing to the Devil's Beat (2009)
James Edge and the Mindstep: In The Hills, The Cities (2010)
The Magic Numbers: The Runaway (2010)

References

External links

1948 births
2009 deaths
People from Bishop's Stortford
People educated at Bishop's Stortford College
Alumni of Gonville and Caius College, Cambridge
British rock keyboardists
British music arrangers